Baby, Don't Get Hooked on Me is the third album by singer-songwriter and actor Mac Davis, which was considered his breakthrough album released in 1972.

Track listing

Charts

Personnel 

 
Ed Caraeff – cover photography

References

Mac Davis albums
Columbia Records albums
1972 albums
Albums arranged by Jimmie Haskell